Clover Maitland  (born 14 March 1972 in Maryborough, Queensland) represents Australia in women's field hockey. The goalie was part of the double winning Olympic team in 1996 and 2000 along with the gold medal winning team in the 1998 Commonwealth Games in Kuala Lumpur, Malaysia.

Maitland was awarded the Medal of the Order of Australia (OAM) in the 1997 Australia Day Honours and the Australian Sports Medal in June 2000.

References

External links
 
 Australian Olympic Committee

Australian female field hockey players
Female field hockey goalkeepers
Field hockey players at the 1996 Summer Olympics
Field hockey players at the 2000 Summer Olympics
Olympic gold medalists for Australia
Olympic field hockey players of Australia
1972 births
Living people
People from Maryborough, Queensland
Olympic medalists in field hockey
Medalists at the 2000 Summer Olympics
Medalists at the 1996 Summer Olympics
Recipients of the Medal of the Order of Australia
Recipients of the Australian Sports Medal
Field hockey people from Queensland
Sportswomen from Queensland